Fabian Freyenhagen (born 1 September 1978) is a British philosopher and Professor of Philosophy at the University of Essex.
He is known for his expertise on critical theory and Kantian ethics.

Books
 Adorno's Practical Philosophy: Living Less Wrongly, Cambridge University Press, 2013 
 Habermas and Rawls: Disputing the Political, Fabian Freyenhagen and Gordon Finlayson, Routledge, 2010  
 The Legacy of John Rawls, edited by Fabian Freyenhagen and Thom Brooks, London: Continuum, 2005

See also
Instrumental and value-rational action

References

External links
Fabian Freyenhagen at the University of Essex

21st-century British philosophers
Philosophy academics
Living people
Alumni of the University of Oxford
Continental philosophers
Kant scholars
Alumni of the University of Sheffield
Academics of the University of Essex
Critical theorists
Political philosophers
Habermas scholars
1978 births